The Idlewild Farm Complex is a  plot of land in Bryn Mawr, Pennsylvania. It was originally part of the Welsh Tract and is now a portion of the Bridlewild Trails Association.

Early Times

In 1698, Welsh farmer Robert Lloyd was deeded  of land near "the road leading through the Black Rocks" now known as Black Rock Road. In 1700, Lloyd built a one room with loft house on the property, complete with beehive oven and walk-in fireplace for help with cooking. Over the next 14 years, Lloyd had eight kids and tended to the farm. However, in 1714, Robert Lloyd died.

Lloyd's wife, Lowry Lloyd, soon remarried. Her new husband added a new portion to the house in 1717 and a wooden barn was built.

The Farm changed hands a few times over the next century. Along with the change of ownership, the barn was rebuilt to stone in 1825, the two portions of the farmhouse were connected in 1825, and a wagon house was added (1827). Eventually the farm was bought by John Williamson (for whom Williamson Road, where the farm currently sits, is named.)  He added a springhouse (1860) at the base of the hill, used both as a cool place to store food and a water source.  Upon his death in 1864, the farm was partitioned between his two sons, Garret and Samuel Williamson. Garret sold his share back to Samuel, who over the next few years added a carriage house, milkhouse, bull pen, and horse stable.

Saunders Times

In 1897, Frances Saunders (wife of medical publisher Walter Saunders) bought what was Idylwild Farm from Samuel Williamson. She bought only 87 of the remaining  of the farm. Around 1900, the farm was changed from a crop and horse farm to a dairy farm, using Ayrshire cows. Although they had a house in the Overbrook neighborhood of Philadelphia, the Saunders wanted a place to work and play during the summer months, for example, they dug a pool in 1924, which is still there today. Although going deaf, she continued to work the farm until Walter deeded it over to his children, Lawrence and Emily, in 1927.

Lawrence Saunders, who had married Dorothy Love in 1924, moved onto the farm and began to work the dairy produce. In 1927, Lawrence began the Bridlewild Trails Association on the property. He also formed in 1951 the Saunders Foundation to maintain a plot called Saunders Woods, which he had bought in  1922. In 1968, Lawrence Saunders died, leaving the farm to his estate. She wrote poetry, worked the farm, and enjoyed farm life. A book of poetry, titled "Unbroken Time" was written at Idlewild and published in 1982.

Natural Lands
In 1983 Idlewild Farm was entered on the National Register of Historic Places for Pennsylvania.

References

Further reading
Lower Merion Historical Society. "The First 300: The Amazing and Rich History of Lower Merion." Lower Merion: Lower Merion Historical Society, 2000.

Houses on the National Register of Historic Places in Pennsylvania
Georgian architecture in Pennsylvania
Houses completed in 1740
Geography of Montgomery County, Pennsylvania
Houses in Montgomery County, Pennsylvania
National Register of Historic Places in Montgomery County, Pennsylvania
1740 establishments in Pennsylvania